Rehab is the fourth studio album by Christian hip hop artist Lecrae. It was released on September 28, 2010 on Reach Records. According to the Reach Records website, the album's "motto" is "The Christian life is an entrance into rehab." Centered on release and freedoms from inhibiting addictions and habits, Rehab is a highly conceptual album. Rehab is nominated for the Grammy Award for Best Rock or Rap Gospel Album at the 53rd Grammy Awards.  The album was named the Best Album of 2010 in the "Best of 2010: Rapzilla.com's Staff Picks" awards, and Lecrae was also named Artist of the Year.  The song "Background" and the album itself were nominated for Rap/Hip Hop Recorded Song of the Year and Rap/Hip Hop Album of the Year, respectively, at the 42nd Annual GMA Dove Awards.

Background
In early 2010, Lecrae had been planning to name his next project "Rehab" although he had doubts about the name, mainly because Eminem released an album of a similar title. Despite this, Lecrae stuck with the original name, because "it made too much sense to not move forward with it."

Release and promotion
On August 3, 2010 Lecrae released "Amp It Up" on Rapzilla that features Tedashii.  Originally thought to be the first single of Rehab, Lecrae stated that it is a theme song for a Christian camp called Kanakuk. A video was posted via Rapzilla on August 19, 2010 of Lecrae rapping a verse from the song "Walking on Water".

According to Lecrae's blog, he will be in Southern Sudan at the time of the album's release so the "distractions of my life are stripped away and I'm left to focus on Jesus and his mission."  He states that he won't be looking at the iTunes Store charts on which his album will be. On his blog he encourages his fans to not only buy his album, but asks them to donate to causes in Sudan and provides a link for them to do so.

On September 22, 2010 Rapzilla reported that the Rehab packaging comes with an advertisement that directs buyers to purchase Rehab: The Overdose to be released on January 11, 2011, called . The whole Rehab album was revealed via a listening session on September 26, 2010 on Rapzilla. Lecrae also talks on the video about the concept of the album. The tracks "High", "Just Like You" and "Children of the Light" have been released as digital download singles on the iTunes Store.

Content
The opening track on the album, "Check In", is simply about Christian "checking in" to "rehab" and introduces the album's concept. Track two, "Killa", is about how there are always two "women" luring humans—one is foolishness and one is wisdom (Lecrae references Proverbs 5, 8 and 9). In "Killa", Lecrae explains how foolishness will "destroy you". "Divine Intervention" is about the need for someone to intervene in addicts' lives to tell them that their actions affect others detrimentally.  "Just Like You", one of the album's singles, is about how we all model our life after someone and conveys the artist's desire to be modeled after Jesus Christ.

Reception

Critical

Rehab received universally positive reviews. Rapzilla's Logan Remy gave Rehab a 4.5/5 rating, calling it "Lecrae's best project to date". He says "The introductory songs all the way to the ending is an incredible ride through the growth of Lecrae," and that "Lecrae is loud and clear in the music." DaSouth.com rated Rehab 4 stars out of 5. Michael Weaver of Jesus Freak Hideout rated the album 5/5 stars, expressing high acclaim for it. He says, "Rehab is a fantastic album and is easily Lecrae's best to date, even topping Rebel. Lecrae is able to show that he is the best and most diverse rapper around." The review suggests to people who rarely listen to hip hop to get this album, even going as far as saying, "This is hip hop perfection." The music website AllMusic gave Rehab 4 of out 5 stars. He explains to readers that Rehab "begins with a Christian checking in to rehab and then, through a series of well-written, well-produced songs, tells the story of how he got there."

Commercial
The album debuted at No. 17 on the Billboard 200. Rapzilla reported that the debut week sales for Rehab were 25,864 units, about 15,000 more than Lecrae's previous album, Rebel. HipHopDX reported this figure at approximately 28,000 units, ahead of Ice Cube's I Am the West which was released on the same day. As of October 26, 2011, the album has sold 124,000 copies sold in the United States.

Awards

The album was nominated for a Dove Award for Rap/Hip-Hop Album of the Year at the 42nd GMA Dove Awards, while the song "Background" was nominated for Rap/Hip-Hop Recorded Song of the Year. The album was nominated for Best Rock or Rap Gospel Album at the 53rd Grammy Awards.

Track listing
 Standard edition

 Deluxe edition

Source:

Personnel
Credits adapted from AllMusic.

 Benjamin "Benjah" Leroy Thom – guitar, keyboards, producer, vocals
 Ford Clay - guitar
 Jeff Carruth – drums
 Cheesebeats – mixing, producer, vocal arrangement
 Silent - mixing
 Chris Lee Cobbins – engineer, vocals
 David Davidson – strings
 Jonpaul Douglass – inside photo
 Torrance "Street Symphony" Esmond – producer
 Tina Fears – vocals
 Marcus "FLAME" Gray – engineer
 Haley Hunt – vocals
 Derek "PRo" Johnson – engineer
 Kajmir Royale – producer
 Carlton Lynn – engineer, mixing
 Alex Medina – producer
 Andy Mineo – engineer
 Jacob "Biz" Morris – engineer
 Jon "JP" Parker – engineer
 Pastor AD3 – engineer
 Courtney Peebles – engineer
 Joseph Prielozny – engineer, acoustic guitar, producer
 Shane Ries - engineer 
 Natalie Sims – vocals
 So Sakryfycial – engineer
 Supa Mario – engineer
 Zach Wolfe – cover photo

Charts

Song charts

References

External links
The Rehab Center

Lecrae albums
2010 albums
Concept albums
Reach Records albums
Albums produced by Street Symphony